The 2010 Women's Hockey Champions Trophy was the 18th edition of the Hockey Champions Trophy for women.  It was held between 10–18 July 2010 in Nottingham, England.

Argentina won the tournament for the fourth time after defeating the Netherlands 4–2 in the final.

Teams
Below are the teams qualified for the tournament, as listed by International Hockey Federation (FIH):
 (Defending champions)
 (Champions of 2008 Summer Olympics and champions of 2006 World Cup)
 (Host nation)
 (Winner of 2009 Champions Challenge I)
 (Second in 2008 Summer Olympics)
 (Fourth in 2008 Summer Olympics)

Umpires
Below are the 8 umpires appointed by the International Hockey Federation:

Frances Block (ENG)
Elena Eskina (RUS)
Amy Hassick (USA)
Soledad Iparraguirre (ARG)
Michelle Joubert (RSA)
Lee Keum-ju (KOR)
Miao Lin (CHN)
Lisa Roach (AUS)

Results
All times are British Summer Time (UTC+01:00)

Pool

Classification

Fifth and sixth place

Third and fourth place

Final

Awards

Statistics

Final standings

Goalscorers

References

External links
Official FIH website
Results book

2010
2010 in women's field hockey
Hoc
International women's field hockey competitions hosted by England
Sport in Nottingham
2010s in Nottingham
Women's Hockey Champions Trophy
2010 in Dutch women's sport
2010 in Argentine women's sport
2010 in German women's sport
2010 in New Zealand women's sport
2010 in Chinese women's sport